Skyvassnuten is a mountain in the municipality of Bykle in Agder county, Norway. The lake Skyvatn lies at the eastern foot of the mountain and the mountain Sveigen lies immediately south of the mountain.

See also
List of mountains of Norway

References

Bykle
Mountains of Agder